Symphogear or Senki Zesshō Symphogear is a 2012 anime television series produced by Satelight with production assistance from Encourage Films during the first season. In the near future, musical warriors wielding armor known as Symphogear fight against an alien race known as the Noise. Hibiki Tachibana, a girl who was rescued from the Noise two years ago by a Symphogear user named Kanade, who died in the ensuing battle, ends up inheriting her power to fight against the Noise.

The first season aired in Japan on Tokyo MX between January 6, 2012 and March 30, 2012 and was licensed in North America and simulcast on Niconico by Funimation Entertainment. The opening theme is "Synchrogazer" by Nana Mizuki whilst the ending theme for the first 12 episodes is "Meteor Light" by Ayahi Takagaki, and for episode 13, "Gyakkou no Flügel" by Nana Mizuki & Minami Takayama. A second season, Senki Zesshō Symphogear G, aired in Japan between July 4, 2013 and September 26, 2013. The opening theme is "Vitalization" by Mizuki whilst the ending theme is "Next Destination" by Takagaki. Bonus OVA episodes were included with the fifth and sixth BD/DVD volumes. A third season, Senki Zesshō Symphogear GX, aired between July 4, 2015 and September 25, 2015 and was simulcast by Crunchyroll. The opening theme is "Exterminate" by Mizuki while the ending theme is "Rebirth-day" by Takagaki.

A fourth and fifth season were announced at Symphogear Live 2016. The fourth season, Senki Zesshō Symphogear AXZ, aired between July 1, 2017 and September 30, 2017. The opening theme is "TESTAMENT" by Mizuki while the ending theme is "Futurism" by Takagaki. The fifth and final season, Senki Zesshō Symphogear XV, aired between July 6, 2019 and September 28, 2019. The opening theme (episodes 2-11; ending for episode 12) is "METANOIA" by Mizuki, while the ending theme (episodes 2-11; opening for episode 12) is "Lasting Song" by Takagaki. The season was initially scheduled to start airing in April. The OVAs, Senki Zesshou Shinai Symphogear, started to be included with G's BDs. The G OVAs are included in the two last BD volumes of the series, while from GX onwards the OVAs are included in the last 4 BD volumes. The first two OVAs haven't an ending theme, while in the GX and AXZ's ones the ending theme is "Itsuka no Niji, Hana no Omoide" by Aoi Yuuki and Yuka Iguchi, except the last AXZ's OVA, which ending theme is "Todoke Happy Uta Zukin!" by Takagaki. From second season G to AXZ, the ending theme for every season finale is "Nijiiro no Flügel", performed by Aoi Yuuki, Nana Mizuki, Ayahi Takagaki, Yoko Hikasa, Yoshino Nanjo, Ai Kayano & Minami Takayama; and for the series finale, the ending theme is "Ashita e no Flügel", performed by Aoi Yuuki, Nana Mizuki, Ayahi Takagaki, Yoko Hikasa, Yoshino Nanjo, Ai Kayano & Yuka Iguchi.

Series overview

Episode list

Symphogear (2012)

Symphogear G (2013)

Bonus episodes

Symphogear GX (2015)

Bonus episodes

Symphogear AXZ (2017)

Bonus episodes

Symphogear XV (2019)

Bonus episodes

Notes

References

Senki Zesshō Symphogear